Rogério Dutra da Silva (born February 3, 1984) is a former Brazilian professional tennis player.

Dutra Silva had a career high ATP singles ranking of 63 achieved on July 24, 2017 and a career high ATP doubles ranking of 84 achieved on February 26, 2018. He won one ATP Doubles Title and 11 ATP Challenger Singles Titles. He retired in 2022, playing his last match at the 2022 Rio Open.

He is the brother of Brazilian tennis player Daniel Dutra da Silva.

ATP career finals

Doubles: 3 (1 title, 2 runner-ups)

Challenger and Futures finals

Singles: 37 (20–17)

Doubles: 35 (13–22)

Singles performance timeline

References

External links

 
 

Brazilian male tennis players
Tennis players from São Paulo
1984 births
Living people
Tennis players at the 2011 Pan American Games
Pan American Games silver medalists for Brazil
Pan American Games bronze medalists for Brazil
Olympic tennis players of Brazil
Tennis players at the 2016 Summer Olympics
Pan American Games medalists in tennis
Medalists at the 2011 Pan American Games